The 1976–77 season was Blackpool F.C.'s 69th season (66th consecutive) in the Football League. They competed in the 22-team Division Two, then the second tier of English football, finishing fifth. The club came within two points of promotion to the first division.

Former Blackpool player Allan Brown succeeded Harry Potts as manager prior to the start of the season.

Mickey Walsh was the club's top scorer for the third consecutive season, with 28 goals (26 in the league, one in the FA Cup and one in the League Cup).

Table

Notes

References

Blackpool F.C.
Blackpool F.C. seasons